Nigul Kaliste (also Nikolai Kalinin; 8 May 1884 Mäe Parish, Võru County – 7 May 1942 Ussolye prison camp, Perm Oblast) was an Estonian politician. He was a member of VI Riigikogu (its Chamber of Deputies) and the Mayor of Mäe Parish.

Kalsie was arrested by Soviet NKVD agents on 12 May 1941 and executed by gunshot.

References

1884 births
1942 deaths
Farmers' Assemblies politicians
20th-century Estonian politicians
Members of the Riigivolikogu
Mayors of places in Estonia
People from Setomaa Parish
Estonian people executed by the Soviet Union
People executed by the Soviet Union by firearm